Keith Langley (born 3 June 1961) is a British gymnast. He competed at the 1980 Summer Olympics and the 1984 Summer Olympics.

References

External links
 

1961 births
Living people
British male artistic gymnasts
Olympic gymnasts of Great Britain
Gymnasts at the 1980 Summer Olympics
Gymnasts at the 1984 Summer Olympics
Sportspeople from Aldershot
20th-century British people